The question of who was responsible for starting the burning of Smyrna continues to be debated, with Turkish sources mostly attributing responsibility to Greeks or Armenians, and vice versa. Other sources, on the other hand, suggest that at the very least, Turkish inactivity played a significant part on the event.

Sources claiming Turkish responsibility

George Horton's account 

George Horton was the U.S. Consul General of Smyrna. He was compelled to evacuate Smyrna on 13 September, and arrived in Athens on 14 September. In 1926, he published his own account of what happened in Smyrna, titled The Blight of Asia. He included testimony from a number of eyewitnesses and quoted a number of contemporary scholars.
Horton's account states that the last of the Greek soldiers had abandoned Smyrna during the evening of 8 September since it was known in advance that Turkish soldiers would arrive on 9 September.

Origins of the Fire 

Horton said that Turkish soldiers set the fire, on 11 September:

Contemporary scholars quoted 
Horton quoted contemporary scholars within his account, including the historian William Stearns Davis: "The Turks drove straight onward to Smyrna, which they took (9 September 1922) and then burned." Also, Sir Valentine Chirol, lecturer at the University of Chicago: "After the Turks had smashed the Greek armies they turned the essentially Greek city (Smyrna) into an ash heap as proof of their victory."

Summary of the destruction of Smyrna 

The following is an abridged summary of notable events in the destruction of Smyrna described in Horton's account:
 Turkish soldiers cordoned off the Armenian quarter during the massacre. Armed Turks massacred Armenians and looted the Armenian quarter.
 After their systematic massacre, uniformed Turkish soldiers set fire to Armenian buildings using tins of petroleum and flaming rags soaked in flammable liquids.
 Soldiers planted small bombs under paving slabs around the Christian parts of the city to take down walls. One of the bombs was planted near the American Consulate and another at the American Girls' School.
 The fire was started on 13 September. The last Greek soldiers had evacuated Smyrna on 8 September. The Turkish Army was in full control of Smyrna from 9 September. All Christians remaining in the city who evaded massacre stayed within their homes, fearing for their lives. The burning of the homes forced Christians into the streets. Horton personally witnessed this.
 The fire was initiated at one edge of the Armenian quarter when a strong wind was blowing toward the Christian part of town and away from the Muslim part of town. Citizens of the Muslim quarter were not involved in the catastrophe. The Muslim quarter celebrated the arrival of the Turkish Army.
 Turkish soldiers guided the fire through the modern Greek and European section of Smyrna by pouring flammable liquids into the streets. These were poured in front of the American Consulate to guide the fire, as witnessed by C. Clafun David, the Chairman of the Disaster Relief Committee of the Red Cross (Constantinople Chapter) and others who were standing at the door of the consulate. Mr Davis testified that he put his hands in the mud where the flammable liquid was poured and indicated that it smelled like mixed petroleum and gasoline. The soldiers who were observed doing this had started from the quay and proceeded towards the fire, thus ensuring the rapid and controlled spread of the fire.
 Dr Alexander Maclachlan, the president of the American College, together with a sergeant of the American Marines, was stripped and beaten with clubs by Turkish soldiers. In addition, a squad of American Marines was fired on.

Charles Dobson
Charles Dobson, an Anglican chaplain in Smyrna, was convinced that the Turks started the fire. He wrote multiple reports stating this belief in response to Turkish denial of responsibility.

Winston Churchill 
Winston Churchill, future Prime Minister of the United Kingdom, then-Secretary of State for the Colonies, wrote in 1929: "Mustapha Kemal's Army...celebrated their triumph by the burning of Smyrna to ashes and by a vast massacre of its Christian population".

American eyewitnesses 
One of the witnesses in Marjorie Housepian Dobkin's account was the American industrial engineer Mark Prentiss, a foreign trade specialist in Smyrna, who was also acting as a freelance correspondent for the New York Times. He was an eyewitness to many of the events which occurred in Smyrna. He was initially quoted in The New York Times as putting the blame on the Turkish military. Prentiss arrived in Smyrna 8 September 1922, one day before the Turkish Army marched into Smyrna. He was a special representative of the Near East Relief (an American charity organization whose purpose was to watch over and protect Armenians during the war). He arrived on the destroyer USS Lawrence, under the command of Captain Wolleson. His superior was Rear Admiral Mark Lambert Bristol, U.S. High Commissioner to the Ottoman Empire from 1919 to 1927, present in Constantinople. Bristol was intent on securing economic concessions for the United States from Turkey and made a concerted effort to prevent any news report to appear to show any favor to the Armenians or Greeks. He once remarked that "I hate the Greeks. I hate the Armenians and I hate the Jews. The Turks are fine fellows."

The former American vice-consul to Persia was so incensed by Bristol's efforts to stifle news coming out of Smyrna, that he took out an op-ed in New York Times to write, "The United States cannot afford to have its fair name besmirched and befouled by allowing such a man to speak for the American soul and conscience."

Prentiss' initial published statements were as follows:

Critics of Prentiss point out that Prentiss changed his story, giving two very different statements of events at different times. Initially, Prentiss had cabled his account, which was printed in The New York Times on 18 September 1922 as "Eyewitness Story of Smyrna's Horror; 200,000 Victims of Turks and Flames". Upon his return to the United States, he was pressured by Mark Bristol, a pro-Turkish American admiral who harboured viciously anti-Greek and anti-Armenian sentiments, to put a different version on record. Prentiss then claimed that it was the Armenians who had set the fire. Bristol reported that during the Turkish capture of Smyrna and the ensuing fire the number of deaths due to killings, fire, and execution did not exceed 2,000. He is the only one to offer such a low estimate of fatalities. William H. King even introduced a resolution in the U.S. Senate asking for an investigation into Bristol's pro-Turkish attitude.

Non-contemporary sources

René Puaux
Based on multiple eyewitness accounts, he concluded that "by Wednesday [13 September] the putrefaction of the bodies, left unattended since the 9th in the evening, became untolerable, explaining what happened. The Turks, having pillaged the Armenian quarter and massacred a great portion of its inhabitants, resorted to fire to erase the trace of their actions." He also quoted a telegraph by Major General F. Maurice, special correspondent for the Daily News in Constantinople, concluding that "The fire started on the 13th, in the afternoon, in the Armenian quarter, but the Turkish authorities did nothing serious to stop it. The next day eyewitnesses saw a large number of Turkish soldiers throwing gasoline and setting houses on fire. The Turkish authorities could have prevented the fire from reaching the European quarters. Turkish soldiers, acting deliberately, are the primary cause of the terrible spread of the disaster."

Professor Rudolf J. Rummel
Genocide scholar Rudolph J. Rummel said that the Turkish side was responsible for the "systematic firing" in the Armenian and Greek quarters of the city. Rummel said that after the Turks recaptured the city, Turkish soldiers and Muslim mobs murdered Armenians, Greeks, and other Christians in the streets of the city by shooting them and hacking them to death; by using the previous claims of Dobkin as a reference, he estimated that the victims of these massacres numbered about 100,000 Christians.

Historians Lowe and Dockrill 
C.J. Lowe and M.L. Dockrill attribute blame for the fire to the "Kemalists," saying it was in retaliation for the earlier Greek occupation of Smyrna and was an attempt to push the Greeks out:

The short-sightedness of both Lloyd George and President Wilson seems incredible, explicable only in terms of the magic of Venizelos and an emotional, perhaps religious, aversion to the Turks. For Greek claims were at best debatable, perhaps a bare majority, more likely a large minority in the Smyrna Vilayet, which lay in an overwhelmingly Turkish Anatolia. The result was an attempt to alter the imbalance of populations by genocide, and the counter determination of Nationalists to erase the Greeks, a feeling which produced bitter warfare in Asia Minor for the next two years until the Kemalists took Smyrna in 1922 and settled the problem by burning down the Greek quarter.

Giles Milton
British author Giles Milton's Paradise Lost: Smyrna 1922 (2008) is a graphic account of the sack of Smyrna (modern İzmir) in 1922 recounted through the eyes of the city's Levantine community. Milton's book is based on eyewitness accounts of those who were there, making use of unpublished diaries and letters written by Smyrna's Levantine elite: He contends that their voices are among the few impartial ones in a highly contentious episode of history.

Paradise Lost chronicles the violence that followed the Greek landing through the eyewitness accounts of the Levantine community. The author offers a reappraisal of Smyrna's first Greek governor, Aristidis Stergiadis, whose impartiality towards both Greeks and Turks earned him considerable enmity amongst the local Greek population.

The third section of Paradise Lost is a day-by-day account of what happened when the Turkish army entered Smyrna. The narrative is constructed from accounts written principally by Levantines and Americans who witnessed the violence first hand, in which the author seeks to apportion blame and discover who started the conflagration that was to cause the city's near-total destruction. According to Milton, the fire was started by the Turkish army, who brought in thousands of barrels of oil and poured them over the streets of Smyrna, with the exception of the Turkish quarter. The book also investigates the role played by the commanders of the 21 Allied warships in the bay of Smyrna, who were under orders to rescue only their own nationals, abandoning to their fate the hundreds of thousands of Greeks and Armenian refugees gathered on the quayside.

Turkish sources claiming Turkish responsibility

Falih Rıfkı Atay 

Falih Rıfkı Atay, a Turkish journalist and author of national renown, is quoted as having lamented that the Turkish army had burnt Smyrna to the ground in the following terms:

Falih Rifki Atay implied that Nureddin Pasha was the person responsible for the fire in his account: "At the time it was said that Armenian arsonists were responsible. But was this so? There were many who assigned a part in it to Nureddin Pasha, commander of the First Army, a man whom Kemal had long disliked..."

Professor Biray Kolluoğlu Kırlı 
Biray Kolluoğlu Kırlı, a Turkish professor of Sociology at Boğaziçi University, published a paper in 2005 in which she argues that Smyrna was burned by the Turkish Army to create a Turkish city out of the cosmopolitan fabric of the old city.

Reşat Kasaba's essay 
Turkish historian Reşat Kasaba noted in a short essay that various pro-Turkish sources offer different and even contradicting explanations for this event. He lists some pro-Turkish accounts: Some of them completely ignore the event or they claim that there was not a fire at all. Additional pro-Turkish accounts claim that the Greeks had severed "all the rubber pipes of the fire brigade", while others suggest that there were many fires, some started by Christians and some by Turks, or that "actual culpability has never been proven" and finally some other pro-Turkish accounts place the blame violent Çetes as a way of clearing the regular nationalist army and the Ottoman and Turkish governments from any responsibility in the events surrounding the fire.

Kasaba later reports that Smyrna's fire brigade was underwritten by the London Insurance Company and included both non-Muslim and Muslim firefighters and adds that:

Sources claiming Greek or Armenian responsibility

Contemporary newspapers and witnesses

Mustafa Kemal's telegram 

On 17 September, when the massacre and the fire in the city had come to an end, Mustafa Kemal Atatürk, future Turkish President and then-Commander-in-Chief of the Turkish armies, sent the Minister of Foreign Affairs Yusuf Kemal the following telegram, describing the official version of events in the city:

A French journalist who had covered the Turkish War of Independence arrived in Smyrna shortly after the flames had died down. He wrote:

The first defeat of the nationalists had been this enormous fire. Within forty-eight hours, it had destroyed the only hope of immediate economic recovery. For this reason, when I heard people accusing the winners themselves of having provoked it to get rid of the Greeks and Armenians who still lived in the city, I could only shrug off the absurdity of such talk. One had to know the Turkish leaders very little indeed to attribute to them so generously a taste for unnecessary suicide.

İzzettin Çalışlar's Military Intelligence report 
Military Governor of Smyrna after the 9th of September 1922 was the commander of the 1st Army Corps, Brigadier general İzzettin Çalışlar, a Greek-Speaking Turkish officer and Mustafa Kemal Ataturk's Chief of Staff during the Turkish War of Independence, who was an eye-witness and present during and after the events. Within his Army Corps the only division that was allowed to enter Smyrna after the 10th of September was the 8th Infantry Division under the command of Major General Kâzım Sevüktekin. The 8th Infantry Division had lost nearly a battalion of its strength, 617 soldiers, 24 officers, as well as 86 war animals when they arrived in Smyrna on the evening of the 10th of September. Moreover the Shock Batallion of the division was sent to protect Karşıyaka; an overwhelmingly Christian (Greek-Armenian-Levantine) neighborhood that was saved from the fire, where Turks were only 19% of the population in 1921. Its Artillery Batallion was spread outside the city center and was stationed in Naldöken, Yenikale, Abdullağa, Kadifekale against allied ships. The only military units that were in downtown during the fire were the reduced number of about more than 3 battalions of 189th and 131st Regiments, and one battalion (3rd Battalion) from the 135th Regiment; within the 8th division. Moreover, the Mounted Pursuit Company of the 1st Army Corps, along with the 57th Division of the Army Corps, was sent to pursue the remainder of the Greek troops under General Frangou in Çeşme; further reducing the number and animals of the division. Çalışlar wrote the following classified intelligence report on the 5th of October 1922 in Smyrna:<ref>{{Cite book |last1=Niş |first1=Kemal |title=Türk İstiklal Harbi II. Cilt Batı Cephesi 6. Kısım III. Kitap Büyük Taarruzda Takip Harekatı (31 Ağustos - 18 Eylül 1922) |last2=Söker |first2=Reşat |last3=Ercan |first3=Tevfik |last4=Anıt |first4=Çetin |date=December 1995 |publisher=Genelkurmay Atase Başkanlığı Yayınları |isbn=9789754090598 |location=Ankara, Türkiye |pages=309-310 |language=Turkish |quote=1 nci Kolordu Komutanlığı İstihbarat Adet : 208/6122 5.10.1338 --------- İzmir 1 nci Ordu Komutanlığı’na İzmir büyük yangını 13 Eylül 38 Çarşamba günü saat 14:15 sonrada Ermeni mahallesinde birkaç noktadan başladı ve 15 Eylül’e kadar devam etti. Bu yangında yanan mahaller :  Ermeni mahallesi, Çalgıcıbaşı, Ayadimitri, Ayakaterine, Ayatrikona, Ayanikola, Surtakya, Hacıfranka mahalleleri kâmilen; Madamcani (nam-ı diğer Yenimahalle), Meyhaneboğazı, Fasolya, Plavmina, Frenk mahalleleri ve Birinci Kordon Ayavukla kısmen yanmıştır. Yanan binaların cins ve miktarı; tahminen 20-25 bin hane, dükkân ve mağazadır. Bunların içinde İzmir Tiyatrohanesi, Kramer Oteli, İzmir Palas, İzmir Posta ve Telgrafhanesi, Sporting klüp, Paris kahvehanesi, Fransız - İtalyan - İngiliz konsoloshaneleri, eski reji idaresi, Frenk mahallesindeki Ektayulo, Şerme, Bonmarşe, Şitayn, Luvr büyük mağazaları, Bakırcıyan ve Papasyan depoları, Ayayorgi caddesindeki büyük ticarethaneler, büyük Çuya hanı, müteaddit büyük hanlar, Ferhaneler, Pasaport civarındaki büyük oteller, Anadolu İtibarı millî Atina, Selanik Tunus ve Cezayir Osmanlı bankaları, Banko di Roma, Pasaport Dairesi, Fasolya, Plavsina ve Peştemalcılarbaşı karakolları velhasıl şehrin en mamur ve ticaretgâh olan kısmı dahildir. Yangın yerinin deniz cephesi tahminen 3200 metre ve denizden içeriye derinliği 5000 metredir. Bu yangının ankasdın Hristiyanlar ve bilhassa Ermeniler tarafından ika edildiğine ber vech-i ati vesaik delâlet etmekte olup, vesaikin cümlesi merbuten takdim kılınmıştır.1. Yangın vukubulduğu zaman Mevki Komutanı olan 8 nci Fırka Komutanının raporu,2. İzmir Sigorta şirketlerinin ve İtfaiye Komuitanı Mösyö Preskoviç’in raporları,3. Kolordu İstihkâm Komutanının raporu,4. Punta’da Alyonti bulvarında 3 No. lu hanede Amerika Kers kumpanyası simsarı Nemseli Mösyö Maks Rozembleh’in hattı desti ile muharrer ve meşhudata müstenit Fransızca raporu,5. İtalyan tebaasından İzmde’de İkinci Kordon’da 34 No.da tütün tüccarı Mösyö Billişaber ile Fransız tebaasından aynı mahalde sakin Mösyö Pasil Rerku’nun müşahadelerine müstenit müşterek Fransızca raporu.6. Fransız tebaasından Esen Oröpeen ticaret şirketi, Kredi Fonsiye Aljeryon bankasının ticaret şubesinden Mösyö Zame M. Milyaki’nin Fransızca raporu.Bunlardan maada yangının Hristiyanlar tarafından yapıldığına ber vech-i ati hususat da delâlet etmektedir :1. 1 nci Ordu İstihbarat dosyalarında mevcut bulunacağı vechile Yunan Başkomutanı sabıkı Papulas, Ayafotini kilisesinde mühim bir içtimada verdiği nutukta “Anadolu’yu terk etmek mecburiyetinde kalırlarsa her tarafı yakıp enkaz ve kül halinde bırakacaklarını’’ alenen söylemişti. Bu mesele gazete sütunlarında dahi mevzu-u bahsolunmuştu. Nitekim Yunan Ordusunun Afyonkarahisar’dan İzmir’e kadar tahliye ettiği şehir, kasaba ve köyleri mütemadiyen yakarak ricat etmesi de vaktiyle tasavvur ve tamim edilmiş mürettep bir plân dahilinde hareket ettiğini ve pek tabiî olarak bu plânda İzmir’in ihrakı da mevcut olacağını anlatmaktadır.

The "Grescovich report" 
Paul Grescovich, an Austrian-born engineer and the chief of the Smyrna Fire Department, seen by Prentiss as "a thoroughly reliable witness", put the blame on Greeks and Armenians. He reported that Smyrna had seen an abnormal amount of fires in the first week of September, some of which were arson cases. Once Turkish troops captured Smyrna, Gresovich asked for more men and equipment to fight the fires. The Turkish authorities didn't provide additional support immediately. They first arrested the Greek firemen, who made up about a fifth of Grescovich's force. The fire department went a few days with reduced staff. On the 11th and 12th, the Turkish army assisted the firefighters in extinguishing fires across the city.

At the same time, Grescovich reported, Armenians were caught setting fires. He stated especially that "his own firemen, as well as Turkish guards, had shot down many Armenian young men disguised either as women or as Turkish irregular soldiers, who were caught setting fires during Tuesday night [12 September] and Wednesday [13 September] morning". Prentiss reports Grescovich as stating that at least six fires were reported around freight terminal warehouses and the Adine railroad passenger station at 11:20, five more around the Turkish-occupied Armenian hospital at 12:00 and nearly at the same time at the Armenian Club, and several at the Cassaba railroad station. Grescovich then asked the military authorities for help, but got no assistance until 6 pm when he was given soldiers who, two hours later, started to blow up buildings to prevent the fire from spreading. Grescovich also criticized the Turkish military for failing to prevent the fire and for responding to it negligently and ineffectively.

Criticism of the Grescovich report 
The Grescovich Report has faced some criticism, including by Robert Shenk, a professor and retired captain in the U.S. Naval Reserve, who wrote that "any fire chief of a city utterly destroyed by fire might have many reasons to invent things in his report".

Turkish scholar Pelin Böke, notes that the report has not been published in any book in its original, whole, form and that it was either partly censored or mistranslated in the previous cases that it was quoted. Historian John Murat apparently references a version of the report which reads "GRESCOVICH REPORT Commander of the Smyrna Insurance Fire Brigade. Revealing the prearranged fire of Smyrna by the Turks. Constantinople 1922."

Non-contemporary sources

Donald Webster's version 
According to US scholar Donald E. Webster, who taught at the International College in Izmir between 1931 and 1934:

Turkish colonel Rachid Galib's claim
In an article published in Current History, Turkish Colonel Rachid Galib stated that Harry Harling Lamb, the British Consul General at Smyrna, reported that he "had reason to believe that Greeks in concert with Armenians had burned Smyrna".

Sources claiming joint Turkish and Armenian responsibility

Contemporary sources

Bilge Umar

Turkish author, researcher and jurist Bilge Umar, whose parents were witnesses to the event and long-time inhabitants of Smyrna, wrote in 1974 that both Turkish and the Armenian sides were guilty for the fire: "Turks and Armenians are equally to blame for this tragedy. All the sources show that the Greeks did not start the fire as they left the city. The fire was started by fanatical Armenians. The Turks did not try to stop the fire."

Non-contemporary sources

Lord Kinross's study 
Echoing Umar's account, and devoting an entire chapter of his biography of Atatürk to the fire, Lord Kinross argues:

Historiography

Notes

References

Occupation of Smyrna